Anastasius Germonius (Anastasio Germonio in Italian and Anastase Germon in French) (15514 August 1627) was an Italian Canon lawyer, diplomatist and archbishop of Tarantaise, who belonged to the family of the marquises of Ceve, in Piedmont, where he was born.

Biography
Anastasio Germonio was born on 27 Feb 1551 in Mondovì, Italy.
On 12 Nov 1607, he was appointed during the papacy of Pope Paul V as Archbishop of Tarentaise.
On 30 Dec 1607, he was consecrated bishop by Domenico Pinelli (seniore), Cardinal-Bishop of Ostia e Velletri, with Vincenzo Querini, Archbishop of Corfù, and Metello Bichi, Bishop Emeritus of Sovana, serving as co-consecrators.

As archdeacon at Turin he was a member of the commission appointed by Pope Clement VIII to edit the Liber Septimus decretalium (later known as the Constitutiones Clementinae); and he also wrote Paratitla on the five books of the Decretals of Gregory IX. He represented the Duke of Savoy at the court of Rome under Clement VIII and Paul V, and was ambassador to Spain under Kings Philip III and IV.

He served as Archbishop of Tarentaise until his death on 4 Aug 1627 in Madrid, Spain.

Germonius is best known for his treatise on ambassadors, De legatis principum et populorum libri tres (Rome, 1627). According to the Encyclopædia Britannica Eleventh Edition, "[t]he book is diffuse, pedantic and somewhat heavy in style, but valuable historically as written by a theorist who was also an expert man of affairs."

Works 
 
 
De legatis principum et populorum libri tres, Rome, 1627.

References

External links and additional sources
 (for Chronology of Bishops) 
 (for Chronology of Bishops)  

17th-century Roman Catholic archbishops in France
Bishops appointed by Pope Paul V
1551 births
1627 deaths
People from Mondovì
Italian Renaissance writers